Essence is the fifth studio album by electronic producer A Guy Called Gerald, which was released on August 14, 2000, through Studio !K7. The album, which initially was intended to be released as Aquarius Rising, is noted for its usage of vocals, something rarely utilized in his previous recordings. According to Gerald Simpson, the album is an attempt for him to focus on melody and songwriting compared to his previous album Black Secret Technology.

Background and production
Production for the album began in 1996, and was originally intended to be issued through Simpson's personal Juice Box Records imprint under the title Aquarius Rising. In 1997, Simpson signed onto Island Records and the album was then planned to be issued through them, this however would change as the label's parent company, PolyGram Records, went through a change in chairman and President, which caused artists such as Simpson to be dropped.

Simpson has described the production for the album to be "therapeutic", as it helped him deal with his decision to leave behind Juice Box Records.

By 1998, Simpson moved out to the United States of America, where work recommenced on the album. By this point, Simpson was signed onto Studio !K7, an independent label from Germany which also has an office in New York City, where Simpson was living at the time. During this later stage of production, the album's title would be changed to Essence as Simpson felt it better described how he felt of the tracks being "living entities" that possessed the illusion of obtaining the "essence of life"

Track listing

Personnel
Gerald Simpson – production, music, writing
Jennifer Neal – spoken word on "The Universe"
Louise Rhodes – vocals
Wendy Page – vocals
David Simpson – vocals
Lady Kier – vocals
Rainer Hosch – photography
Gary St. Clare – design
David Calderley – design
ZG Management – management

References

External links
Essence on Discogs
Essence on Bandcamp

2000 albums
A Guy Called Gerald albums